Jan Jankowicz (9 September 1932 – 3 June 2019) was a Polish gymnast. He competed in eight events at the 1964 Summer Olympics.

References

External links
 

1932 births
2019 deaths
Polish male artistic gymnasts
Olympic gymnasts of Poland
Gymnasts at the 1964 Summer Olympics
People from Skarżysko County